Chinatown Kid is a 1977 Shaw Brothers kung fu film directed by Chang Cheh, with action choreography by Robert Tai Chi Hsien and Lee Ka Ting, and starring Alexander Fu Sheng and the Venom Mob.

The film deals with drugs, police corruption and gang warfare in San Francisco's Chinatown district.

Plot 
Struggling to survive the murderous gang wars of Hong Kong, Tan Tung (Alexander Fu Sheng), a young martial arts street fighter, successfully takes on all challengers—until he runs up against the savage underworld empire of Hong Kong's Triad mafia. Escaping to San Francisco, he again tangles with criminal gangs, but this time fights his way to the top of the city's most feared gangster organization led by the White Dragon boss (Kuo Chui). At last, his rise to power leads to a final, murderous, gang-land war for control of all Chinatown. And in the end, Tan Tung must decide whether he will use his awesome skills to fight for evil ... or for to help his best friend Yang Ching.

Cast
 Alexander Fu Sheng as Tan Tung
 Sun Chien as Yang Chien-wen
 Jenny Tseng  as Yvonne/Lee Wa Fung 
 Philip Kwok as Hsiao Pai-lung, the boss of White Dragon gang
 Lo Mang as Huang Hu-ti, the boss of Green Tiger gang 
 Shirley Yu as Lena Chen
 Siu Yam-yam as Hsin Wa
 Wang Lung-wei as Xu Hao
 Hung Tsai as Wan
 Ching Ho Wang as Tan Tung's grandfather
 Chih Ching-wang as Chinese restaurant owner

References

External links 
 
 Chinatown Kid at Hong Kong Cinemagic
 
 Chinatown Lost - detailed breakdown of the Chinese vs English release

1977 films
1977 martial arts films
1977 action films
Chinatown, San Francisco
Films directed by Chang Cheh
Films set in San Francisco
Films shot in San Francisco
Hong Kong martial arts films
Kung fu films
Shaw Brothers Studio films
1970s Hong Kong films
1970s Mandarin-language films